Combes is a commune in the Hérault department in southern France.

Constituent settlements

The following settlements all fall within the boundaries of the commune:
 Les Agasses
 Les Arts
 La Capoulade
 La Carral
 Combes
 Le Fraïsse
 Lamalou-le-Vieux
 Le Laousas
 Le Logis neuf
 Le Roumegas
 Saint Vital
 Torteillan
 Le Vernet

Population

See also
Communes of the Hérault department

References

Communes of Hérault